The Hunter TR-12 is a multi-purpose infantry mobility vehicle designed to carry troops to dangerous areas.

Design
The Hunter TR-12's crew compartment is a monohull mounted on an independent chassis.  It provides Level B6 (Standard EN 1063) protection levels, offering protection against rifle fire and ambushes.  Each side of the hull has equipped two small armored windows and firing ports. Two doors are mounted at the front of each side of the crew compartment with small window and firing port.  The Hunter TR-12 can mount a 360 degree roof turret with an M60 machine gun, an M2HB-QCB machine gun, or a Mk 19 grenade launcher.  Weapons can be fitted to a remote weapons station.  Its 4×4 chassis and runflat tires can handle off-road terrain.  The vehicle has a crew of two and is capable of carrying 10 troops.  The standard configuration has one spare wheel at the rear and comes with search lights and a thermal camera.  It can be optionally fitted with blackout lights, a snorkel, and front winch.

History
The Hunter TR-12 was first unveiled at the 2011 Worldwide Exhibition of Internal State Security Milipol in Paris, France.  In November 2012, the Colombian Army selected it as the winner of its Meteor MRAP. There is a project for 1500 vehicles tender. The first Hunter TR-12 was delivered in December 2012, and a second was delivered in July 2013.

Related Development 

 Hunter XL

Operators

References

External links
Hunterarmor.com
Armorinternational.com 

Vehicles introduced in 2011
All-wheel-drive vehicles
Wheeled armoured personnel carriers
Military vehicles introduced in the 2010s
Military equipment of Colombia
Armoured personnel carriers of the post–Cold War period